In international relations, international order refers to patterned or structured relationships between actors on the international level.

Definition 
David Lake, Lisa Martin and Thomas Risse define "order" as "patterned or structured relationships among units".

Michael Barnett defines an international order as "patterns of relating and acting" derived from and maintained by rules, institutions, law and norms. International orders have both a material and social component. Legitimacy (the generalized perception that actions are desirable, proper or appropriate) is essential to political orders. George Lawson has defined an international order as "regularized practices of exchange among discrete political units that recognize each other to be independent." John Mearsheimer defines an international order "an organized group of international institutions that help govern the interactions among the member states."

In After Victory (2001), John Ikenberry defines a political order as "the governing arrangements among a group of states, including its fundamental rules, principles and institutions."

The United Nations has been characterized as a proxy for how states broadly perceive the international order.

Jeff Colgan has characterized international order as entailing multiple subsystems. These subsystems can experience drastic change without fundamentally changing the international order.

Liberal international order

The liberal international order describes a set of global, rule-based, structured relationships based on political liberalism, economic liberalism and liberal internationalism since the late 1940s. More specifically, it entails international cooperation through multilateral institutions (like the United Nations, World Trade Organization and International Monetary Fund) and is constituted by human equality (freedom, rule of law and human rights), open markets, security cooperation, promotion of liberal democracy, and monetary cooperation. The order was established in the aftermath of World War II, led in large part by the United States.

The nature of the liberal international order, as well as its very existence, has been debated by scholars. The LIO has been credited with expanding free trade, increasing capital mobility, spreading democracy, promoting human rights, and collectively defending the West from the Soviet Union. The LIO facilitated unprecedented cooperation among the states of North America, Western Europe and Japan. Over time, the LIO facilitated the spread of economic liberalism to the rest of the world, as well as helped consolidate democracy in formerly fascist or communist countries.

Origins of the LIO have commonly been identified as the 1940s, usually starting in 1945. John Mearsheimer has dissented with this view, arguing that the LIO only arose after the end of the Cold War. Core founding members of the LIO include the states of North America, Western Europe and Japan; these states form a security community. The characteristics of the LIO have varied over time. Some scholars refer to a Cold War variation of the LIO and a post-Cold War variation. The Cold War variation was primarily limited to the West and entailed weak global institutions, whereas the post-Cold War variation was worldwide in scope and entailed global institutions with "intrusive" powers.

Aspects of the LIO are challenged internally within liberal states by populism, protectionism and nationalism. Scholars have argued that embedded liberalism (or the logics inherent in the Double Movement) are key to maintaining public support for the planks of the LIO; some scholars have raised questions whether aspects of embedded liberalism have been undermined, thus leading to a backlash against the LIO.

Externally, the LIO is challenged by authoritarian states, illiberal states, and states that are discontented with their roles in world politics. China and Russia have been characterized as prominent challengers to the LIO. Some scholars have argued that the LIO contains self-undermining aspects that could trigger backlash or collapse.

See also

 International relations (IR), or International studies (IS), the study of foreign affairs and global issues among states within the international system
 International law, implicit and explicit agreements that bind together sovereign states
 United Nations (UN), an international organization to facilitate international cooperation
 World Trade Organization (WTO), an international organization designed to supervise and liberalize international trade
 World Bank, an international financial institution
 International Monetary Fund (IMF), an international organization that oversees the global financial system
 International organization, an organization with an international membership, scope, or presence
 Non-governmental organization (NGO), a legally constituted, non-governmental organization with no participation or representation of any government
 The liberal international order, a particular international order centered on cooperation between liberal democratic states and U.S.-led multilateral institutions
 New International Economic Order, a set of proposals advocated by developing countries
 New world order (politics), a post–Cold War political concept promulgated by Mikhail Gorbachev and George H.W. Bush
 World government, the notion of a single common political authority for all of humanity
 World-system within the world-systems theory, a socioeconomic theory associated with thinkers such as Andre Gunder Frank and Immanuel Wallerstein
 Neorealism in international relations, or structural realism, a theory of international relations, which includes:
 Hegemonic stability theory (HST), a theory that the international system is more likely to remain stable when a single nation-state is the dominant world power
 Power (international), state power, including economic and military power
 Anarchy in international relations, a concept in international relations theory holding that the world system lacks a global authority Alliance of Civilizations
 Clash of Civilizations
 Global policeman
 World Federalist Movement

References 

Social sciences